Cloudwords is an American software company based in San Francisco, California, specializing in Software-as-a-Service (SaaS) technology.

History 
Cloudwords was co-founded on March 26, 2010, by Michael Meinhardt and Scott Yancey, who raised $3 million in seed funding from individuals including Marc Benioff, Chairman and CEO of Salesforce, and Salesforce founding CTO Dave Moellenhoff. The company raised $2.4 million in Series A funding in May 2012, led by Storm Ventures, and completed a $9.1 million Series B round of funding in November 2013.  investors include Storm Ventures, UMC Capital, GMB Consulting LLC, Marc Benioff and other individual investors.

In May 2016 Yancey was replaced as CEO by Richard Harpham, who had been Vice President of Sales and Marketing.

Cloudwords officially launched in February 2011 and in August that year debuted the Basic and Professional editions of its software. The company focuses on assisting large companies in localizing their marketing; in April 2017 the company announced a partnership with Lilt, a translation productivity startup.

References 

Software companies based in California
Software companies of the United States
2010 establishments in California
Companies based in San Francisco
Software companies established in 2010
American companies established in 2010